Munich-Lochhausen station is a railway station in the Aubing-Lochhausen-Langwied borough of Munich, Germany.

References

External links

Munich S-Bahn stations
Lochhausen